Flavarchaea is a genus of South Pacific shield spiders that was first described by Michael Gordon Rix in 2006.

Species
 it contains eight species, found only in Australia and on New Caledonia:
Flavarchaea anzac Rix, 2006 – Australia (Queensland)
Flavarchaea badja Rix, 2006 – Australia (New South Wales, Australian Capital Territory)
Flavarchaea barmah Rix, 2006 – Australia (New South Wales, Victoria)
Flavarchaea hickmani (Rix, 2005) – Australia (Tasmania)
Flavarchaea humboldti Rix & Harvey, 2010 – New Caledonia
Flavarchaea lofty Rix, 2006 – Australia (South Australia)
Flavarchaea lulu (Rix, 2005) (type) – Australia (Tasmania)
Flavarchaea stirlingensis Rix, 2006 – Australia (Western Australia)

See also
 List of Malkaridae species

References

Araneomorphae genera
Malkaridae
Spiders of Australia